Sepsisoma is a genus of flies in the family Richardiidae. There are about 13 described species in Sepsisoma.

Species
These 13 species belong to the genus Sepsisoma:

 Sepsisoma anale (Schiner, 1868)
 Sepsisoma atra (Walker, 1853)
 Sepsisoma erythrocephalum (Schiner, 1868)
 Sepsisoma flavescens Johnson, 1900
 Sepsisoma geniculatum (Schiner, 1868)
 Sepsisoma goldschmidti Lindner, 1930
 Sepsisoma minimum Steyskal, 1961
 Sepsisoma nigronitens Hendel, 1911
 Sepsisoma opacum Hendel, 1911
 Sepsisoma reductum Lindner, 1930
 Sepsisoma sabroskyi Steyskal, 1961
 Sepsisoma sepsioides (Schiner, 1868)
 Sepsisoma umbripenne Hendel, 1911

References

Further reading

External links

 

Tephritoidea genera
Articles created by Qbugbot